1976 had new titles such as Road Race, Night Driver, Heavyweight Champ, Sea Wolf and Breakout. The year's highest-grossing arcade games were Namco's F-1 in Japan and Midway's Sea Wolf in the United States.

Highest-grossing arcade games

Japan
In Japan, Game Machine magazine published the first annual arcade game earnings chart for 1976 in their February 1977 issue, listing both arcade video games and electro-mechanical games (EM games) on the same arcade chart. Namco's EM racing game F-1 was the highest-grossing overall arcade game of the year, followed by Taito's video game Ball Park (originally released as Tornado Baseball by Midway Manufacturing in North America). The following titles were the highest-grossing arcade games of 1976, according to the first annual Game Machine chart.

Note: Medal games are listed on a separate chart, with Nintendo's EVR Race being the highest-grossing medal game of the year.

United States
In the United States, RePlay magazine began publishing annual lists of top-grossing arcade games in 1976, covering both arcade video games and pinball machines. The following titles were the top ten arcade video games of the year, in terms of coin drop earnings. Lifetime arcade cabinet sales are also given in a separate column.

Events
 October – Warner Communications acquires Atari for $28 million USD. Nolan Bushnell stays on as chairman.
 3.5 million video games are sold, earning the retail video game industry $242 million in revenue.
 54,000 video game arcade cabinets and 310,000 home video game cartridges are sold in the United States.

Business
 New companies: Apple Computer, Data East

Notable releases

Games
 January – Sega releases Heavyweight Champ, the first video game to feature hand-to-hand fighting. It uses controls that simulate throwing actual punches.
 February – Sega releases Road Race.
 April 1 – Exidy releases Death Race to video arcades. News of the game's existence breaks nationally in newspapers in the first week of July after a quiet nationwide rollout. The game sparks a public outcry over violence in video games, and is banned in many areas.
 April – Taito releases Speed Race Twin, a sequel to Speed Race that allows simultaneous two-player competitive gameplay
 May 13 – Atari releases Breakout, whose prototype was designed by Apple Computer cofounders Steve Jobs and Steve Wozniak, to video arcades.
 August – Sega releases Man T.T., also known as Moto-Cross, an early motorbike racing game, using a pseudo-3D, forward-scrolling, third-person perspective, similar to Road Race. It also introduces haptic feedback, causing the handlebars to vibrate during collisions. Sega-Gremlin re-brands it as Fonz.
 October – Atari releases Night Driver, a first-person perspective racing video game.
 October – Gremlin releases Blockade, the first of what become known as snake games.
 While working at the Stanford Artificial Intelligence Lab, Don Woods discovers and expands Will Crowther's Adventure. Later in the year, James Gillogly ports Woods's version of the interactive fiction title from Fortran to the C programming language for Unix-based computers.

Hardware
 November – Fairchild Camera and Instrument releases the Video Entertainment System (later known as the VES or Channel F), the first video game console to use a microprocessor and cartridges.
 Coleco releases the Telstar, a console clone of Pong based on General Instrument's AY-3-8500 microchip.

Notes

See also
1976 in games

References

Video games
Video games by year